An aphrodisiac is a substance alleged to increase sexual desire, sexual attraction, sexual pleasure, or sexual behavior. Substances range from a variety of plants, spices, foods, and synthetic chemicals. Natural aphrodisiacs like cannabis or cocaine are classified into plant-based and non-plant-based substances. There are non-naturally occurring aphrodisiacs like MDMA and methamphetamine. Aphrodisiacs can be classified by their type of effects (i.e., psychological or physiological). Aphrodisiacs that contain hallucinogenic properties like Bufotenin have psychological effects on a person that can increase sexual desire and sexual pleasure. Aphrodisiacs that contain smooth muscle relaxing properties like yohimbine have physiological effects on a person that can affect hormone levels and increase blood flow.

It is possible that the aphrodisiac effect of a substance is due to the placebo effect. Substances that impede on areas that aphrodisiacs aim to enhance are classified as anaphrodisiacs.

Both males and females can potentially benefit from the use of aphrodisiacs, but they are more focused on males as their properties tend to increase testosterone levels rather than estrogen levels. This is in part due to the historical context of aphrodisiacs, which focused solely on males. Only recent attention has been paid to understanding how aphrodisiacs can aid female sexual function. In addition, cultural influence in appropriate sexual behavior from males and females also play a part in the research gap.

History
The name comes from the Greek ἀφροδισιακόν, aphrodisiakon, i.e. "sexual, aphrodisiac", from aphrodisios, i.e. "pertaining to Aphrodite", the Greek goddess of love. Throughout human history, food, drinks, and behaviors have had a reputation for making sex more attainable and/or pleasurable. However, from a historical and scientific standpoint, the alleged results may have been mainly due to mere belief by their users that they would be effective (placebo effect). Likewise, many medicines are reported to effect libido in inconsistent or idiopathic ways: enhancing or diminishing overall sexual desire depending on the situation of the subject. For example, Bupropion (Wellbutrin) is known as an antidepressant that can counteract other co-prescribed antidepressants having libido-diminishing effects. However, because Wellbutrin only increases the libido in the special case that it is already impaired by related medications, it is not generally classed as an aphrodisiac.

Ancient civilizations like Chinese, Indian, Egyptian, Roman, and Greek cultures believed that certain substances could provide the key to improving sexual desire, sexual pleasure, and/or sexual behavior. This was important because some men suffered from erectile dysfunction and could not reproduce. Men who were unable to impregnate their wives and father large families were seen as failures, whereas those who could were respected. Hence, a stimulant was needed. Others who did not suffer from this also desired performance enhancers. Regardless of their usage, these substances gained popularity and began to be documented with information being passed down generations. Hindu cultures wrote poems dated back around 2000 to 1000 BC that spoke of performance enhancers, ingredients, and usage tips. Chinese cultures wrote text dated back to 2697 to 2595 BC. Roman and Chinese cultures documented their belief in aphrodisiac qualities in animal genitalia while Egyptian wrote tips for treating erectile dysfunction. In Post-classical West Africa, a volume titled Advising Men on Sexual Engagement with Their Women from the Timbuktu Manuscripts acted as a guide on aphrodisiacs and infertility remedies. It offered advice to men on "winning back" their wives. According to Hammer, "At a time when women’s sexuality was barely acknowledged in the West, the manuscript, a kind of Baedeker to orgasm, offered tips for maximizing sexual pleasure on both sides."

Ambergris, Bufo toad, yohimbine, horny goat weed, ginseng, alcohol, and certain foods are recorded throughout these texts as containing aphrodisiac qualities. While numerous plants, extracts or manufactured hormones have been proposed as aphrodisiacs, there is little high-quality clinical evidence for the efficacy or long-term safety of using them.

There has been increasing attention in recent years surrounding the use of aphrodisiac drugs. In 2020, Julian Savulescu and co-editor Brian Earp published a philosophy book entitled Love Drugs: The Chemical Future of Relationships. They argued that certain forms of medications can be ethically consumed as a "helpful complement" in relationships. Both to fall in love, and, to fall out of it.

Types

Ambrien

Ambrien is found in the gut of sperm whales. It is commonly used in Arab cultures as relief medication for headaches or as a performance enhancer.  The chemical structure of Ambrien has shown to increase testosterone levels triggering sexual desire and sexual behavior in animal studies only.  Further research is needed to know the effects on humans.

Bufotenin
Bufotenin is found in the skin and glands of Bufo toads.  It is commonly used in West Indian and Chinese cultures.  West Indian cultures use it as an aphrodisiac called 'Love Stone'.  Chinese cultures use bufotenin as heart medication called Chan su. Research shows that it can have a negative effect on heart rate.

Yohimbine

Yohimbine is a substance found in the bark of yohim trees in West Africa. It was traditionally used in West African cultures, in which the bark would be boiled and the resulting water drunk until its effects showed proven benefits in increasing sexual desire. It  has been approved by the Food and Drug Administration and can be prescribed for sexual dysfunction in the United States and Canada. It is also found in over-the-counter health products. The chemical structure of yohimbine is an indole alkaloid that contains an adrenergic receptor blocker. This blocker affects the central nervous system, autonomic nervous system, and penile tissue and vascular smooth muscle cells that help men with physiological issues and treats psychogenic erectile dysfunction. Known side effects include nausea, anxiety, irregular heartbeats, and restlessness.

Horny goat weed
Horny goat weed (Epimedii herba) is used in Chinese folk medicine. It was thought useful for treating medical conditions and improving sexual desire, sexual pleasure, and/or sexual behavior. Horny goat weed contains icariin, a flavanol glycoside.

Alcohol

Alcohol has been associated as an aphrodisiac due to its effect as a central nervous system depressant. Depressants can increase sexual desire and sexual behavior through disinhibition. Alcohol affects people both physiologically and psychologically, and is therefore difficult to determine exactly how people are experiencing its aphrodisiacal effects (i.e., aphrodisiac qualities or the expectancy effect). Alcohol taken in moderate quantities can elicit a positive increase in sexual desire whereas larger quantities are associated with difficulties reaching sexual pleasure. Chronic alcohol consumption is related to sexual dysfunction.

Marijuana

Marijuana reports are mixed with half of users claiming an increase in sexual desire and sexual pleasure while the other half reports no effect. Consumption, individual sensitivity, and possibly marijuana strain are known factors that affect results.

Food

Many cultures have turned to food as a source of increasing sexual desire; however, significant research is lacking in the study of aphrodisiac qualities in food. Most claims can be linked to the placebo effect aforementioned. Misconceptions revolve around the visual appearance of these foods in relation to male and female genitalia (i.e., carrots, bananas, oysters, and the like). Other beliefs arise from the thought of consuming animal genitals and absorbing their properties (i.e., cow cod soup in Jamaica or balut in the Philippines). Korean bug is a popular aphrodisiac in China, Korea, and Southeast Asia either eaten alive or in gelatin form. The caterpillar fungus (Ophiocordyceps sinensis) is another aphrodisiac used in China. The story of Aphrodite, who was born from the sea, is another reason why individuals believe seafood is another source of aphrodisiacs. Foods that contain volatile oils have gained little recognition in their ability to improve sexual desire, sexual pleasure, and/or sexual behavior because they are irritants when released through the urinary tract. Chocolate has been reported to increase sexual desire in women who consume it over those who do not. Cloves and sage have been reported to demonstrate aphrodisiac qualities but their effects are not yet specified. Tropical fruits, such as Borojó and Chontaduro are considered energizers in general and sexual energizers in particular.

Ginseng
Ginseng is the root of any member of the genus Panax. Ginseng's active ingredients are ginsenosides and saponin glycosides. There are three different ways to process ginseng. Fresh ginseng is cut at four years of growth, white ginseng is cut at four to six years of growth, and red ginseng is cut, dried, and steamed at six years of growth.  Red ginseng has been reported to be the most effective aphrodisiac of the three. Known side effects include mild gastrointestinal upset.

Maca is a Peruvian plant sometimes called "Peruvian ginseng" (but not closely related to Panax). It has been used as a tonic to improve sexual performance.

Synthetic

 
Popular party substances have been reported by users to consist of aphrodisiac properties because of their enhancing effects with sexual pleasure.
Ecstasy users have reported an increase in sexual desire and sexual pleasure; however, there have been reports of delays in orgasm in both sexes and erectile difficulties in men. Poppers, an inhalant, have been linked to increased sexual pleasure. Known side effects are headaches, nausea, and temporary erectile difficulties.

Phenethylamines
Amphetamine, methylphenidate, and methamphetamine are phenethylamine derivatives which are known to increase libido and cause frequent or prolonged erections as potential side effects, particularly at high supratherapeutic doses where sexual hyperexcitability and hypersexuality can occur; however, in some individuals who use these drugs, libido is reduced.

2C-B was sold commercially in 5 mg pills as a purported aphrodisiac under the trade name "Erox", which was manufactured by the German pharmaceutical company Drittewelle.

Testosterone
Libido in males is linked to levels of sex hormones, particularly testosterone. When a reduced sex drive occurs in individuals with relatively low levels of testosterone, particularly in postmenopausal women or men over age 60, dietary supplements that are purported to increase serum testosterone concentrations have been used with intent to increase libido, although with limited benefit. Long-term therapy with synthetic oral testosterone is associated with increased risk of cardiovascular diseases.

Risks
Solid evidence is hard to obtain as these substances come from many different environments cross-culturally and therefore affect results due to variations in its growth and extraction. The same is also true for unnatural substances as variations in consumption and individual sensitivity can affect results. Folk medicine and self-prescribed methods can be potentially harmful as side effects are not fully known and therefore are not made aware to the people searching this topic on the internet.

In popular culture

The invention of an aphrodisiac is the basis of a number of films including Perfume: The Story of a Murderer, Spanish Fly, She'll Follow You Anywhere, Love Potion No. 9 and A Serbian Film. The first segment of Woody Allen's Everything You Always Wanted to Know About Sex* (*But Were Afraid to Ask) is called "Do Aphrodisiacs Work?", and casts Allen as a court jester trying to seduce the queen. The "Despair Arc" of Danganronpa 3: The End of Hope's Peak High School features a class being dosed with aphrodisiacs.

See also

 Pheromone
 Anaphrodisiac
 Date rape drug
 Empathogen–entactogen
 Food and sexuality
 Fork Me, Spoon Me, 2006 book
 Hypersexuality
 Hypoactive sexual desire disorder
 Phytoestrogen
 Phytoandrogen
 Vyleesi

Citations

General and cited references 
 Gabriele Froböse, Rolf Froböse, Michael Gross (Translator): Lust and Love: Is It More than Chemistry? Royal Society of Chemistry, 2006; .
 Michael Scott: Pillow Talk: A Comprehensive Guide to Erotic Hypnosis and Relyfe Programming. Blue Deck Press, 2011; .

External links

 Aphrodisiacs and Anti-aphrodisiacs: Three Essays on the Powers of Reproduction by John Davenport.

 
Drug classes defined by psychological effects
Sex and drugs